Wilsonville is a town in southeastern Shelby County, Alabama, United States, located northeast of Columbiana. At the 2020 census, the population was 1,857. Wilsonville is named after the earliest settler in the area, Elisha Wilson.

The town was incorporated in 1897. 3 years later in 1900, it had the distinction of being the largest community in Shelby County with 1,095, edging out the county seat of Columbiana by 20 people. It lost the distinction to Columbiana in 1910 and would not exceed its 1900 population again until 1990.

Geography
Wilsonville is located at  (33.234924, -86.486283).

The town is located in the southeastern part of Shelby County, with parts of its city limits extending east to the western shore of the Coosa River. Alabama State Route 25 is the main highway through the town, running northeast to southwest through the downtown area. Via AL 25, Harpersville is 9 mi (14 km) northeast, and Columbiana, the Shelby County seat, is 9 mi (14 km) southwest.

Demographics

2020 census

As of the 2020 United States census, there were 1,857 people, 841 households, and 603 families residing in the town.

2010 census
At the time of the census of 2010, there were 1,867 people, 610 households, and 486 families residing in the town. The racial makeup of the town was 92.52% White, 5.22% Black or African American, 0.90% Native American, 0.77% Asian, 0.26% from other races, and 0.32% from two or more races. 0.58% of the population were Hispanic or Latino of any race.

There were 610 households, out of which 31.3% had children under the age of 18 living with them, 66.9% were married couples living together, 8.5% had a female householder with no husband present, and 20.3% were non-families. 18.2% of all households were made up of individuals, and 8.7% had someone living alone who was 65 years of age or older. The average household size was 2.54 and the average family size was 2.84.

In the town, the population was spread out, with 23.5% under the age of 18, 6.0% from 18 to 24, 27.9% from 25 to 44, 26.6% from 45 to 64, and 16.0% who were 65 years of age or older. The median age was 41 years. For every 100 females, there were 97.1 males. For every 100 females age 18 and over, there were 94.7 males.

The median income for a household in the town was $42,105, and the median income for a family was $48,409. Males had a median income of $40,263 versus $25,598 for females. The per capita income for the town was $21,112. About 4.5% of families and 7.4% of the population were below the poverty line, including 7.8% of those under age 18 and 5.8% of those age 65 or over.

Notable people

Laurie C. Battle, U.S. Representative from Alabama
Howard Hill. world-famous archer and stunt archer for Errol Flynn in The Adventures of Robin Hood.
E. B. Teague, prominent Alabama Baptist minister of the 19th century; helped organize Wilsonville Baptist Church in 1879.

References

Towns in Shelby County, Alabama
Towns in Alabama
Birmingham metropolitan area, Alabama